Delaware's 9th Senate district is one of 21 districts in the Delaware Senate. It has been represented by Democrat Jack Walsh since 2016, succeeding fellow Democrat Karen Peterson.

Geography
District 9 covers the areas between Newark and Wilmington in New Castle County, including parts of Pike Creek, Pike Creek Valley, Newport, Stanton, and far eastern Newark proper.

Like all districts in the state, the 9th Senate district is located entirely within Delaware's at-large congressional district. It overlaps with the 17th, 18th, 19th, 21st, and 24th districts of the Delaware House of Representatives.

Recent election results
Delaware Senators are elected to staggered four-year terms. Under normal circumstances, the 9th district holds elections in presidential years, except immediately after redistricting, when all seats are up for election regardless of usual cycle.

2020

2016

2012

Federal and statewide results in District 9

References 

9
New Castle County, Delaware